Clyde Victor Beattie (21 August 1905 – 17 April 1978) was an Australian rules footballer who played with St Kilda in the Victorian Football League (VFL).

Notes

External links 

1905 births
1978 deaths
Australian rules footballers from Tasmania
St Kilda Football Club players
North Hobart Football Club players